Huétor de Santillán is a municipality located in the province of Granada, southern Spain. Its territory is located at the feet of the Sierra de Huétor, between the Sierra Arana and the Sierra de la Alfaguara mountain ranges.

The main attraction is the 16th-century church of the Incarnation.

References

Municipalities in the Province of Granada